Colbeck may refer to

People with the surname
James Colbeck (1801–1852), English stonemason who worked on the Ross Bridge, Tasmania
Joe Colbeck (born 1986), English athlete in football
Julian Colbeck (born 1952), English musician and businessman
Patrick Colbeck (born 1965), American politician
Richard Colbeck (born 1958), Australian politician
William Colbeck (gangster) (1890–1943), US politician and organized crime figure
William Colbeck (seaman) (1871–1930), British seaman who distinguished himself on 2 Antarctic expeditions
William Henry Colbeck (1823–1901), New Zealand politician

Places or other uses
Cape Colbeck in Antarctica
Colbeck, Ontario
Colbeck Archipelago in Antarctica
Colbeck Basin in Antarctica
Colbeck Bay in Antarctica

See also
John Macleod of Colbecks

Surnames
English-language surnames
Surnames of English origin
Surnames of British Isles origin